Marc Bischofberger (born 26 January 1991) is a Swiss freestyle skier competing in ski cross discipline.

Career
He finished 16th at the 2015 World Championships and 10th at the 2017 World Championships. He then won the silver medal at the 2018 Olympic Games.

He made his World Cup debut in March 2013 in Åre. He recorded his first top-10 in December 2013, when finishing seventh in Innichen, and won his first World Cup event in January 2015 in Val Thorens.

References

External links
 
 
 
 

1991 births
Living people
Swiss male freestyle skiers
Olympic freestyle skiers of Switzerland
Olympic silver medalists for Switzerland
Olympic medalists in freestyle skiing
Freestyle skiers at the 2018 Winter Olympics
Medalists at the 2018 Winter Olympics
Marc
21st-century Swiss people